Nathaniel Wales may refer to:
 Nathaniel Wales (American politician), American businessman and politician from Massachusetts
 Nathaniel Wales (architect), New Zealand architect and politician
 Nathaniel B. Wales, American inventor